Abbot Hall is a town hall and historical museum located at 188 Washington Street, Marblehead, Massachusetts. It is open year-round, though with restricted hours in the colder months. Constructed in 1876 and designed in the Romanesque style by Lord & Fuller architects, the Hall is listed on the National Register of Historic Places as a contributing property in the historic district. It is the fourth "town hall" built in Marblehead, having been preceded by the First Meeting House(1638, Old Burial Hill), the Old Meeting House(1696), and the Old Town House (1727). Abbot Hall is named after a barrel maker and trader named Benjamin Abbot. When Benjamin Abbott died in 1872, he donated his fortune to the town of Marblehead.

In addition to serving as the seat of Marblehead's town government, Abbot Hall has holdings as a museum. It contains the original c. 1875 painting The Spirit of '76 by American Archibald MacNeal Willard, which was widely reproduced; the 1684 deed to Marblehead signed by descendants of Wenepoykin, youngest son of Nanepashemet, chief or sachem of the regional Pawtucket confederation of Abenaki peoples prior to Pilgrim settlement; a bust of native son and U.S. Vice-President Elbridge Gerry; a painting of Marbleheaders rowing Washington across the Delaware River during the American Revolution; a painting by primitivist J.O.J. Frost, and a number of other historical artifacts.  A plaque on display in the Selectmen's room, discovered in the Philadelphia Navy Yard, proclaims Marblehead as the "Birthplace of the American Navy."

Clock
The clock in the tower of Abbot Hall is a Howard #2S installed in 1877; it is governed by a  pendulum escapement, driven by an  weight. The clangor escapement is governed by a flutter vane assembly and is powered by a  weight. The Bell was cast by Meneely & Kimberly in Troy, New York. Every week the maintenance workers ascend the tower to wind the movements. Local authors have featured the clock in numerous stories.

See also
National Register of Historic Places listings in Essex County, Massachusetts

References

External links

City and town halls on the National Register of Historic Places in Massachusetts
Government buildings completed in 1876
Museums in Essex County, Massachusetts
Maritime museums in Massachusetts
Buildings and structures in Marblehead, Massachusetts
Clock towers in Massachusetts
National Register of Historic Places in Essex County, Massachusetts
Individually listed contributing properties to historic districts on the National Register in Massachusetts